was a Japanese Roman Catholic author and philanthropist. She was the founder of the Michiko Inukai Foundation, which provides financial aid for refugees seeking education.

Biography 
Michiko Inukai was born in Yotsuya, Tokyo, the eldest daughter of a politician Takeru Inukai and his wife Nakako. Her paternal grandfather was Prime Minister Tsuyoshi Inukai. She had a younger brother Yasuhiko Inukai, a journalist who later became president of Kyodo News, and a half-sister Kazu Ando, an essayist. Sadako Ogata, UN High Commissioner for Refugees, is Michiko's first cousin once removed.

Having graduated from Gakushuin Girls' School and Tsuda College, Michiko Inukai went to study philosophy in Boston, Massachusetts in 1948. In 1959, she was sent to Europe as a correspondent for Chuokoronsha.

Her first book Ojosan Horoki was published in 1958, and she has since written essays about the Bible and Christianity. Her bestseller Hanabana to Hoshiboshi to was featured in a TV drama in 1978.

Inukai started charity in 1979. In 1983, she founded the Michiko Inukai Foundation to provide aid for refugees and internally displaced people in collaboration with the Jesuit Refugee Service. The foundation also manages a computer school in Romania.

Works 
Ojosan Horoki, 1958
Onna ga Soto ni Deru Toki, 1964
Watashi no Amerika (My America), 1966
Hanabana to Hoshiboshi to, 1970
Shin'yaku Seisho Monogatari (New Testament Stories), 1976
Kyuyaku Seisho Monogatari (Old Testament Stories), 1977
Kawaku Daichi - Ningen no Daichi, 1989
Aru Rekishi no Musume, 1995
Seisho o Tabisuru, 1996
Josei e no Junana no Tegami (Seventeen Letters for Women), 1998
Mirai kara no Kako, 2001
Kokoro no Zahyojiku, 2006

References

Foototes

External links 
Michiko Inukai Foundation 

1921 births
2017 deaths
Japanese philanthropists
Japanese Roman Catholics
Roman Catholic writers
Writers from Tokyo
Tsuda University alumni
Michiko
20th-century Japanese women writers
20th-century Japanese writers
21st-century Japanese women writers
21st-century Japanese writers
20th-century philanthropists